Zealandoberis is a genus of flies in the family Stratiomyidae.

Species
Zealandoberis lacuans (Miller, 1917)
Zealandoberis micans (Hutton, 1901)
Zealandoberis substituta (Walker, 1854)
Zealandoberis violacea (Hutton, 1901)

References

Stratiomyidae
Brachycera genera
Diptera of Australasia